The Toitoi River is a river in Stewart Island/Rakiura, New Zealand.

See also
List of rivers of New Zealand

References

Rivers of Stewart Island